The Minnesota Twins baseball team have had many broadcasters in their history in Minnesota. Here is a list of the people who have been a part of bringing the Twins to the people of Minnesota.

Radio

Television

References

 
Minnesota Twins
Minnesota Twins broadcasters
Broadcasters
Fox Sports Networks
Bally Sports